The ITF Women's Circuit – Sanya was a tournament for professional female tennis players played on outdoor hard courts in Sanya, China. The event was classified as a $50,000 ITF Women's Circuit tournament which first took place in 2011.

Past finals

Singles

Doubles

External links 
 ITF search 

 
ITF Women's World Tennis Tour
Hard court tennis tournaments
Tennis tournaments in China
2011 establishments in China
Recurring sporting events established in 2011
Sport in Sanya
Recurring sporting events disestablished in 2013